Torbert Hart Macdonald (June 6, 1917 – May 21, 1976) was an American Democratic politician from Massachusetts. He represented the northern suburbs of Boston, including his home town of Malden, in the U.S. House of Representatives from 1955 until his death in 1976. Macdonald was a close political and personal ally of President John F. Kennedy, his former roommate at Harvard College.

Biography

Macdonald was born in Everett, Massachusetts, in 1917 and grew up in Malden. After several years in public school, he entered Phillips Academy in Andover. Macdonald attended Harvard University, where he was captain of the Crimson football team and the roommate of John F. Kennedy. They remained close friends throughout their lives, with Macdonald serving as an usher at then-Senator Kennedy's wedding and as an honorary pallbearer at President Kennedy's funeral. At Harvard, Macdonald earned his B.A. in 1940 and his LL.B. in 1946 from its law school.

Macdonald served in the United States Navy as a PT boat commander in the Southwest Pacific theater from 1942 to 1944, and was awarded the Silver Star, Purple Heart and Presidential Unit Citation. He was admitted to the bar in 1946 and commenced the practice of law in Boston as a partner in the firm of Stoneman, Macdonald & Chandler. Macdonald was a member of the National Labor Relations Board for the New England area from 1948 to 1952, and he was a delegate to the Democratic National Conventions in 1960, 1964, and 1968.

Macdonald was elected as a Democrat to the 84th Congress in 1954. During his career, he served as majority Whip, and as ranking Democrat on the House Committee on Interstate and Foreign Commerce. He was often referred to as the "Father of Public Broadcasting", since he was one of the legislators primarily responsible for Public Broadcasting Act of 1967. He was also responsible for the "sports blackout bill" which provides for the broadcast of local sold-out sporting contests.

Another focus was his effort to reform campaign broadcasting practices, addressing his concern that competent candidates were being priced out of the process, and others were buying their way in. While recognized as an active legislator, he was also justly noted for his high level of service to individual constituents and their problems. His sharp wit and sense of humor garnered him among his Congressional colleagues the nickname "The Needle". He was reelected ten times, and died in office on May 21, 1976, in Bethesda, Maryland, aged 58.

Personal life, death, and legacy
Macdonald married actress Phyllis Brooks on June 23, 1945, in Tarrytown, New York. They remained married until his death. He and Brooks had four children, the eldest of whom (Torbert Hart Macdonald Jr.) was President Kennedy's godson. The other children were Laurie, Brian, and Robin.

Macdonald died at Bethesda Naval Hospital (Bethesda, Maryland) after he had ordered doctors to remove life‐support systems. Macdonald was interred in Holy Cross Cemetery in Malden, Massachusetts.

The memorial stone dedicated to Torbert Macdonald was originally dedicated in 1984 by the Italian Heritage Society but moved to the Macdonald Stadium facility and placed alongside the memorial of Torbert's late father, John G. "Jack" Macdonald, for whom Macdonald Stadium was named.

Macdonald was portrayed by actor Stan Cahill in the 1993 television miniseries JFK: Reckless Youth.

See also
 List of United States Congress members who died in office (1950–99)

References

External links
 
 

Harvard Crimson football players
Harvard Law School alumni
Phillips Academy alumni
Players of American football from Massachusetts
Massachusetts lawyers
Politicians from Everett, Massachusetts
Military personnel from Massachusetts
United States Navy personnel of World War II
Recipients of the Silver Star
United States Navy officers
1917 births
1976 deaths
Democratic Party members of the United States House of Representatives from Massachusetts
20th-century American politicians
20th-century American lawyers
Harvard College alumni